"So" is a song by heavy metal band Static-X. It is the eleventh track and second single from their album Shadow Zone. It is also the last release with then guitarist Tripp Eisen. The music video features the band performing in Studio 202 and various cut scenes to Wayne Static playing individually. It also features cut scenes of Wayne Static driving his truck. The video was directed by Darren Lynn Bousman.

Chart performance

References

2004 singles
Static-X songs
2003 songs
Warner Records singles
Songs written by Tony Campos
Songs written by Ken Jay
Songs written by Wayne Static
Songs written by Tripp Eisen
Song recordings produced by Josh Abraham